Enigmatix is an album by jazz pianist Roberto Magris released on the JMood label in 2015, featuring performances by Magris with his trio from Kansas City.

Reception

The DownBeat review by Carlo Wolff awarded the album 3½ stars and simply states: "Italian pianist Roberto Magris goes modern and groovy on Enigmatix, his intriguing foray into complex funk and pop." The All About Jazz review by Jack Bowers awarded the album 4 stars and simply states: "In spite of the album's esoteric title, the music is resolutely transparent and accessible with no shortage of melody, harmony or rhythm. A spellbinding showcase for Roberto Magris whose notable artistry enables Enigmatix to stand out in a crowd." The All About Jazz review by Edward Blanco awarded the album 4 stars and simply states: "Pianist Roberto Magris takes on the challenge of modern jazz by producing a stellar new sound on the creative Enigmatix, featuring a tad more of his improvisational skills, compositional diversity and excellent musicianship in delivering another outstanding outing affirming his reputation as one of the finest piano men in the world."

Track listing
 Enigmatix - part 1 (Roberto Magris) - 12:55 
 Counterparts (Roberto Magris) - 5:47 
 No Sadness (Roberto Magris) - 6:33 
 J.F. No Key (Roberto Magris) - 14:25 
 Enigmatix - part 2 (Roberto Magris) - 10:15 
 My Cherie Amour (Stevie Wonder) - 8:01 
 Do It Again (Fagen/Becker) - 8:12

Personnel

Musicians
Roberto Magris - piano
Dominique Sanders - bass
Brian Steever - drums
Pablo Sanhueza - congas and percussion
Monique Danielle - vocal (on # 3)

Production
 Paul Collins – executive producer and producer
 George Hunt – engineering
 Stephen Bocioaca – design
 Jerry Lockett – photography

References

2015 albums
Roberto Magris albums